Necmettin is the Turkish version of the Arabic name Najm al-Din. It may refer to:

Necmettin Erbakan (1926–2011), Turkish politician
Necmettin Imac (born 1987), Dutch footballer
Necmettin Karaduman (born 1927), Turkish politician and former parliament speaker
Necmettin Sadak (1890–1953), Turkish politician

Turkish masculine given names